The 1938–39 Yorkshire Cup, was the thirty-first occasion on which the  Yorkshire County Cup competition was held.

The previous year's defeated finalists returned for a second year, but this year they were triumphant, Huddersfield winning the trophy by beating Hull F.C. by the score of 18–10.

The match was played at Odsal in the City of Bradford, now in West Yorkshire. The attendance was 28,714 and receipts were £1,534.

For the  losers, Hull FC, it was to be their fifth defeat in six appearances in the Yorkshire Cup final.

Background 

This season there were no junior/amateur clubs taking part, no new entrants but Newcastle folded and so there is one less entrant, reducing the  total number to fifteen.

This in turn resulted in one bye in the first round.

Competition and results

Round 1 
Involved  7 matches (with one bye) and 15 clubs

Round 1 - replays  
Involved  1 match and 2 clubs

Round 2 – quarterfinals 
Involved 4 matches and 8 clubs

Round 3 – semifinals  
Involved 2 matches and 4 clubs

Final

Teams and scorers 

Scoring - Try = three (3) points - Goal = two (2) points - Drop goal = two (2) points

The road to success

Notes and comments 
1 * Odsal is the home ground of Bradford Northern from 1890 to 2010 and the current capacity is in the region of 26,000, The ground is famous for hosting the largest attendance at an English sports ground when 102,569 (it was reported that over 120,000 actually attended as several areas of boundary fencing collapse under the sheer weight of numbers) attended the replay of the Challenge Cup final on 5 May 1954 to see Halifax v Warrington.

General information for those unfamiliar 
The Rugby League Yorkshire Cup competition was a knock-out competition between (mainly professional) rugby league clubs from  the  county of Yorkshire. The actual area was at times increased to encompass other teams from  outside the  county such as Newcastle, Mansfield, Coventry, and even London (in the form of Acton & Willesden.

The Rugby League season always (until the onset of "Summer Rugby" in 1996) ran from around August-time through to around May-time and this competition always took place early in the season, in the Autumn, with the final taking place in (or just before) December. (The only exception to this was when disruption of the fixture list was caused during, and immediately after, the two World Wars.)

See also 
1938–39 Northern Rugby Football League season
Rugby league county cups

References

External links
Saints Heritage Society
1896–97 Northern Rugby Football Union season at wigan.rlfans.com
Hull&Proud Fixtures & Results 1896/1897
Widnes Vikings - One team, one passion Season In Review - 1896–97
The Northern Union at warringtonwolves.org

1938 in English rugby league
RFL Yorkshire Cup